Hong Kong participated in the 1982 Asian Games in Delhi, India on November 19 to December 4, 1982. Hong Kong ended the games with single bronze only.

References

Nations at the 1982 Asian Games
1982
Asian Games